Sujal Shrestha (born 4 February 1993) is Nepalese footballer. He plays for club Machhindra F.C. in Martyr's Memorial A-Division League as a midfielder. He was called to Nepal squad for the 2014 FIFA World Cup qualifiers.

Club career 
Sujal Shrestha is a Nepalese striker who was born in Dhankuta. After graduating from ANFA Academy in 2006 he joined the Sankata Boys Sports Club a year later, he then signed for the Manang Marshyangdi Club in 2008.

Shrestha scored the equalizing goal in an AFC President's Cup match against FC HTTU. Manang Marshyangdi though went on to lose the match 3-1.

Shrestha played for Manang Marshyangdi Club at the 35 edition Governor's Gold Cup. On October 19 Shrestha scored a penalty kick in the semifinals in a 3-1 win over Sikkim FA. On October 21 in the final against ONGC F.C. Shretha scored another penalty kick after Cederic Aba was brought down in the box, and then set up Zikahi Dodoz for MMC's second goal as they came from 2-0 down to tie 2-2. MMC however would go on to lose the match on penalty kicks.

In the group stage match of the 2014 Aaha! Rara Gold Cup Shrestha scoring in the seventh twice in an eventual 7-0 win over Kanchanjunga FC of Sikkim, India.

On 2 July 2015 Shrestha signed a monthlong loan deal with CFC Bhutan, with the option of a second month. Shrestha is joined by fellow MMC player Rupesh KC as well as Surendra Thapa of Morang XI. The players will each be paid 64,000 rupees a month. On 25 July 2015, Sujal scored his first goal with brace for CFC Bhutan as they obliterated Paro United FC 3-1. On 2 August 2015, Sujal accelerated his goalscoring ability and scored twice in Bhutan national league for CFC Bhutan against FC Tertons as game remained stalemate.

International career 
Shrestha made his debut against Bhutan at Pokhara in 2011. He scored his first international goal in 5-0 world qualifier match victory against Timor-Leste. He also played for Nepal at the 2012 Nehru Cup. In 2016, he scored second goal for Nepal against Macau in 2016 AFC Solidarity Cup. Shrestha's third international goal came against African nation Mauritius in 2022 international friendly.

International goals 

Scores and results list Nepal's goal tally first.

References

External links 
 

1993 births
Living people
Sportspeople from Kathmandu
Association football midfielders
Nepalese footballers
Nepal international footballers
Manang Marshyangdi Club players
Expatriate footballers in Bhutan
Nepalese expatriate sportspeople in Bhutan
Nepalese expatriate footballers
Nepalese expatriate sportspeople in India
South Asian Games gold medalists for Nepal
South Asian Games medalists in football